Roll Call is a newspaper and website published in Washington, D.C., United States, when the United States Congress is in session, reporting news of legislative and political maneuverings on Capitol Hill, as well as political coverage of congressional elections across the country.

Roll Call is the flagship publication of CQ Roll Call, which also operates: CQ (formerly Congressional Quarterly), publisher of a subscriber-based service for daily and weekly news about Congress and politics, as well as a weekly magazine. Roll Call's regular columnists are Walter Shapiro, Mary C. Curtis, Patricia Murphy, and Stu Rothenberger.

History 
Roll Call was founded in 1955 by Sid Yudain, a press secretary to Congressman Al Morano (R-Conn.).  The inaugural issue of the newspaper was published on June 16, 1955, with an initial printing of 10,000 copies. Richard Nixon, then Vice President of the United States, wrote a letter to Yudain congratulating him on the new venture. Nixon's letter ran on the front page of the inaugural issue.

In 1986, Yudain sold Roll Call to Arthur Levitt, who was serving as the chairman of the American Stock Exchange at the time of the sale. Yudain continued to work as a columnist at Roll Call after the sale.

The Economist Group acquired Roll Call in 1993. Roll Call merged with CQ in 2009 after the latter company was purchased by The Economist Group.

In July 2018, a deal was announced for CQ Roll Call to be acquired by FiscalNote.

Brand franchises

"Heard on the Hill" 
In January 1988, Roll Call launched the "Heard on the Hill" column, which covers the intrigue of life and work in and around Capitol Hill. Alex Gangitano wrote Heard on the Hill from 2014 to 2018 before leaving to cover lobbying for The Hill. On 30 April 2019, Roll Call announced the current Heard on the Hill writing team of Clyde McGrady and Kathryn Lyons.

Congressional Baseball Game

In 1962, Roll Call began sponsoring the annual Congressional Baseball Game for Charity. In 1965, the first Roll Call Trophy was awarded—to the Republican team, which was the first team to win three games since Roll Call began its sponsorship. Since then, a new trophy has been awarded to the next team that wins three games (over the next three, four, or five years), following the year in which the most recent trophy was awarded. Roll Call also sponsors the Congressional Baseball Hall of Fame.

Notable Roll Call staff
 Kathryn Lyons, Heard on the Hill reporter
 Camila Dechalus, Immigration Reporter
 Rebecca Adams, Senior Editor
 Megan Scully, Senior Editor
 Ed Timms, Investigations Editor 
 Herb Jackson, Politics Editor
 Jason Dick, Deputy Editor
 Lindsey Gilbert, Deputy Editor
 Lindsey McPherson, Senior Writer
 Niels Lesniewski, Senior Writer
 John M. Donnelly, Senior Writer
 Jennifer Shutt, Budget and Appropriations Reporter  
 Bridget Bowman, Politics Reporter 
 Simone Pathé, Politics Reporter 
 Stephanie Akin, Politics Reporter
 Kate Ackley, Lobbying Reporter

Notable Roll Call alumni 
 Mary Ann Akers, staff writer for Politico
 Christina Bellantoni, assistant managing editor for politics for Los Angeles Times
 Chris Cillizza, politics reporter and editor-at-large for CNN
 Tim Curran, Sunday Editor for The Washington Post
 Steven T. Dennis, Senate reporter for Bloomberg
 Matt Fuller, politics editor for The Daily Beast
 Emily Heil, co-author the Reliable Source, The Washington Post
 Ed Henry, chief national correspondent for Fox News Channel
 Paul Kane, senior congressional correspondent for The Washington Post
 Pablo Manriquez, publicist at Center for Investigative Reporting
 Steve Kornacki, national political correspondent for NBC News and MSNBC
 John McArdle, producer and co-host for C-SPAN's Washington Journal
 Norah O'Donnell, co-anchor for CBS This Morning
 Ben Pershing, Managing Editor for National Journal
 Mark Preston, executive editor for CNN Politics
 Glenn R. Simpson, Founder of Fusion GPS
 Jake Tapper, anchor for CNN's The Lead with Jake Tapper and State of the Union
 Katherine Tully-McManus, Congressional Reporter for Politico
 Nina Totenberg, correspondent for National Public Radio
 Jim VandeHei, co-founder and CEO of Axios; former executive editor and co-founder of Politico
 Rachel Van Dongen, editor of PowerPost for The Washington Post

Political Theater Podcast
Political Theater Podcast is a Roll Call podcast hosted by Jason Dick.

See also
List of newspapers in Washington, D.C.

References

External links
 

1955 establishments in Washington, D.C.
Economist Group
Legislative branch of the United States government
Newspapers published in Washington, D.C.
Publications established in 1955